Seweweekspoortpiek (Afrikaans for ‘Seven Weeks Defile Peak’) is a peak in the Western Cape, South Africa. It is the highest mountain in the Cape Fold Belt and the highest point in the Western Cape province. Along with its western neighbour, Du Toits Peak, it qualifies as an Ultra and these are the only two in the country.

It is located in the Klein Swartberg range, close to the Seweweekspoort mountain pass.

See also
List of Ultras of Africa

References

External links
 
 
 Kannaland Municipality IDP (includes information about Seweweekspoortpiek)

Mountains of the Western Cape
Karoo